In Australia, an Oath of Allegiance or an Affirmation of Allegiance are oaths of allegiance required to be made to the monarch of Australia in some situations. Oaths of Allegiance are usually made on a Bible, or some other book holy to the person, such as a Torah or Koran; but the person may opt to make an affirmation in lieu of an oath. Note that this oath is not the same as the Australian Citizenship Pledge which is required to be made when being naturalised as an Australian citizen.

Oath of Allegiance
All members of the Australian Parliament are required to make, before taking their seat in Parliament, an oath or affirmation of allegiance before the Governor-General of Australia. The requirement to take the oath is set out in section 42 of the Australian Constitution and the wording of the oath and affirmation are set out in the Schedule to the Constitution. The oath is:

 
The affirmation is:

(NOTE.—The name of the King or Queen of the United Kingdom of Great Britain and Ireland for the time being is to be substituted from time to time.)

Oath of Office
Upon taking office, a Governor-General designate is required to take the above Oath of Allegiance as well as a separate Oath of Office, in the presence of the Chief Justice or another Justice of the High Court.

In addition to swearing the Oath of Allegiance upon becoming a member of parliament, the Prime Minister, ministers and parliamentary secretaries also recite an Oath of Office upon entering office. The wording of this oath is not prescribed within the constitution and is ultimately determined by the prime minister of the day. Traditionally, the oath has repeated the swearing of allegiance to the sovereign, although this is not required. The current Oath of Office is:

Armed forces
The oath taken by a member of the navy, army or air force is:

The affirmation:

Australian citizenship

Pledge of Commitment for citizenship

The wording of the Oath of Allegiance taken by newly naturalising Australian citizens has changed over time. Australian nationality was created by the Nationality and Citizenship Act 1948, which came into effect on 26 January 1949. British subjects could become Australian citizens after one year's residence in Australia as an immigrant by registration, and there was no requirement to attend a citizenship ceremony or take an oath of allegiance. Non-British subjects, on the other hand, were required to apply for naturalization, which had stricter requirements, including a five-year residency. They were required to attend a citizenship ceremony and swear an oath of allegiance, which was:

I, A. B; swear by Almighty God that I will be faithful and bear true allegiance to His Majesty King George the Sixth, his heirs and successors according to law, and that I will faithfully observe the laws of Australia and fulfil my duties as an Australian citizen.

In 1966, the Holt Government added the clause "renouncing all other allegiance" to the oath, though there was no requirement for new citizens to formally take steps under the law of their former country to renounce the previous citizenship. In 1973, the Whitlam Government ended the preferential treatment for British subjects from 1 December 1973 and inserted a reference to the "Queen of Australia", to become:

I, A. B., renouncing all other allegiance, swear by Almighty God that I will be faithful and bear true allegiance to Her Majesty Elizabeth the Second, Queen of Australia, Her heirs and successors according to law, and that I will faithfully observe the laws of Australia and fulfil my duties as an Australian citizen.

In 1986, the Hawke Government removed the renunciation requirement and the requirement for candidates to state their names, the wording becoming:
I swear by Almighty God that I will be faithful and bear true allegiance to Her Majesty Elizabeth the Second, Queen of Australia, Her heirs and successors according to law, and that I will faithfully observe the laws of Australia and fulfil my duties as an Australian citizen.

In 1994, the Keating Government replaced the oath with a Pledge of Commitment to Australia and removed the reference to the Crown:
From this time forward, [under God,]
I pledge my loyalty to Australia and its people,
whose democratic beliefs I share,
whose rights and liberties I respect, and
whose laws I will uphold and obey.

The prospective citizen has the option of making the pledge with or without the words "under God".

There have been no changes since.

Australian Citizenship Affirmation

There is also a variant known as the Australian Citizenship Affirmation that was first recited at Galston Park in NSW on Australia Day 1999 that reads:

As an Australian citizen,
I affirm my loyalty to Australia and its people,
Whose democratic beliefs I share,
Whose rights and liberties I respect,
And whose laws I uphold and obey.

The Department of Home Affairs encourages use of this affirmation by school students and members of the general public including on such occasions as Harmony Day, Refugee Week, Australian Citizenship Day (17 September) and Australia Day (26 January).

Debate of broadening Oath of Allegiance
In February 2018, Peter Dutton as Minister for Home Affairs, said he supports Australian school kids taking the Oath of Allegiance in schools just like immigrants.

In January 2020 Labor then-Shadow Minister for Education Tanya Plibersek called for school children to learn the Australian citizenship pledge at school.

References

Australia
Government of Australia
Monarchy in Australia
Australian nationality law